Ariel Geltman Graynor (born April 27, 1983) is an American actress, known for her roles in TV series such as I'm Dying Up Here, The Sopranos and Fringe, in stage productions such as Brooklyn Boy and The Little Dog Laughed, and in films such as Whip It and For a Good Time, Call... She also starred as Meredith Davis on the short-lived CBS television sitcom Bad Teacher in 2014.

Early life
Graynor was born April 27, 1983, in Boston, Massachusetts, the daughter of Joani Geltman, a parenting expert, and Greg Graynor, a contractor.

Her mother is from a Jewish family; her father is from a Polish and Roman Catholic background, and converted to Judaism. Graynor was raised Jewish. Her paternal grandfather's surname was changed from "Gryzna".

She attended Buckingham Browne & Nichols, a private school in Cambridge, Massachusetts (Class of 2001), and Trinity College, Hartford, Connecticut.

During a June 29, 2017, CBS late-night interview with Stephen Colbert, promoting I'm Dying Up Here, she mentioned she went to a prom with future congressman Joseph Kennedy III.

Career
Graynor first came to prominence as Caitlin Rucker on HBO's The Sopranos. Her film credits include An American Crime (2007), which premiered in January 2007 at the Sundance Film Festival. She also appeared early in the second season of UPN's Veronica Mars as the daughter of a bus driver. She made her Broadway debut as 'Alison' in 2005's Brooklyn Boy after appearing in the world premiere at South Coast Repertory. She also appeared in The Little Dog Laughed.
 
Graynor played Elvina, a pop star, in CSI: Miami, and was a recurring guest star on the Fox series Fringe, playing Agent Olivia Dunham's younger sister, Rachel.  In 2008, Graynor appeared in the film Nick and Norah's Infinite Playlist, and in October 2009, she also was in Whip It, a comedy film directed by Drew Barrymore and written by Shauna Cross, based on Cross' young adult novel Derby Girl.

In 2010, she appeared in the play Trust at the off-Broadway Second Stage theatre company with Sutton Foster, Zach Braff, and Bobby Cannavale.  In the fall of 2011, she appeared on Broadway in the Woody Allen-written segment of three one-act comedies collectively called Relatively Speaking. She played Nina Roth in Allen's “Honeymoon Motel” segment.
 
In 2012, Graynor starred in the comedy For a Good Time, Call..., and is also credited as the film's executive producer. Graynor starred on Broadway opposite Cheyenne Jackson, Henry Winkler, and Alicia Silverstone in David West Read's play The Performers, which opened November 2012 at the Longacre Theatre.

She appeared in Yen, a play by Anna Jordan. Yen opened off-Broadway at the Lucille Lortel Theatre on January 31, 2017, directed by Trip Cullman.

Filmography

Film

Television

References

External links

 

1983 births
Actresses from Boston
American film actresses
American people of Polish descent
Jewish American actresses
American television actresses
Living people
Trinity College (Connecticut) alumni
21st-century American actresses
Buckingham Browne & Nichols School alumni
21st-century American Jews